Maly Semyachik is a stratovolcano located in the eastern part of Kamchatka Peninsula, Russia. It is a compound stratovolcano located in a 10-km-wide caldera within the 15x20 km mid-Pleistocene Stena-Soboliny caldera. Three overlapping stratovolcanoes were constructed sequentially along a NE-SW line, with the youngest cone, Tseno-Semyachik, at the southwest end. A hot, acidic crater lake fills the historically active Troitsky Crater, which formed during a large explosive eruption of Ceno-Semiachik about 400 years ago.

The water in the lake has an unusual bright turquoise color. It's because the waters of the lake are poisonous due to the content of several types of acids and other chemical compounds of the periodic table.

The water in the lake never freezes, even when everything is covered with a layer of ice and deep snow. The name "Semyachik" in translation from Itelmensky means "Stone Earth".

References

Mountains of the Kamchatka Peninsula
Volcanoes of the Kamchatka Peninsula
Stratovolcanoes of Russia
Volcanic crater lakes
Calderas of Russia
Pleistocene calderas